Stratone is a genus of beetles in the family Cerambycidae, containing the following species:

 Stratone aurantia Galileo & Martins, 1992
 Stratone rufotestacea Thomson, 1864
 Stratone transversalis (Chevrolat, 1862)

References

Heteropsini